"To Make Love Sweeter For You" is a song written by George Morgan and performed by Jerry Lee Lewis. The song was Jerry Lee Lewis' third number one on the country chart and his first since "Great Balls of Fire" in 1958.  "To Make Love Sweeter For You" stayed at number one for a single week and spent a total of thirteen weeks on the country chart.

Chart performance

References

1968 singles
Jerry Lee Lewis songs
1968 songs
Song recordings produced by Jerry Kennedy
Smash Records singles
Songs written by George Morgan (singer)